The arrondissement of Niort is an arrondissement of France in the Deux-Sèvres department in the Nouvelle-Aquitaine region. It has 121 communes.

Composition

The communes of the arrondissement of Niort, and their INSEE codes, are:
 
 Aiffres (79003)
 Aigondigné (79185)
 Alloinay (79136)
 Amuré (79009)
 Arçais (79010)
 Asnières-en-Poitou (79015)
 Aubigné (79018)
 Augé (79020)
 Avon (79023)
 Azay-le-Brûlé (79024)
 Beaussais-Vitré (79030)
 Beauvoir-sur-Niort (79031)
 Bessines (79034)
 Bougon (79042)
 Le Bourdet (79046)
 Brieuil-sur-Chizé (79055)
 Brioux-sur-Boutonne (79057)
 Brûlain (79058)
 Caunay (79060)
 Celles-sur-Belle (79061)
 La Chapelle-Pouilloux (79074)
 Chauray (79081)
 Chef-Boutonne (79083)
 Chenay (79084)
 Chérigné (79085)
 Cherveux (79086)
 Chey (79087)
 Chizé (79090)
 Clussais-la-Pommeraie (79095)
 Coulon (79100)
 Couture-d'Argenson (79106)
 La Crèche (79048)
 Échiré (79109)
 Ensigné (79111)
 Épannes (79112)
 Exireuil (79114)
 Exoudun (79115)
 Fontenille-Saint-Martin-d'Entraigues (79122)
 Fontivillié (79064)
 Fors (79125)
 Les Fosses (79126)
 La Foye-Monjault (79127)
 François (79128)
 Fressines (79129)
 Frontenay-Rohan-Rohan (79130)
 Germond-Rouvre (79133)
 Granzay-Gript (79137)
 Juillé (79142)
 Juscorps (79144)
 Lezay (79148)
 Limalonges (79150)
 Lorigné (79152)
 Loubigné (79153)
 Loubillé (79154)
 Luché-sur-Brioux (79158)
 Lusseray (79160)
 Magné (79162)
 Mairé-Levescault (79163)
 Maisonnay (79164)
 Marcillé (79251)
 Marigny (79166)
 Mauzé-sur-le-Mignon (79170)
 Melle (79174)
 Melleran (79175)
 Messé (79177)
 Montalembert (79180)
 La Mothe-Saint-Héray (79184)
 Nanteuil (79189)
 Niort (79191)
 Paizay-le-Chapt (79198)
 Pamproux (79201)
 Périgné (79204)
 Pers (79205)
 Plaine-d'Argenson (79078)
 Pliboux (79212)
 Prahecq (79216)
 Prailles-La Couarde (79217)
 Prin-Deyrançon (79220)
 La Rochénard (79229)
 Rom (79230)
 Romans (79231)
 Saint-Coutant (79243)
 Sainte-Eanne (79246)
 Sainte-Néomaye (79283)
 Sainte-Soline (79297)
 Saint-Gelais (79249)
 Saint-Georges-de-Rex (79254)
 Saint-Hilaire-la-Palud (79257)
 Saint-Maixent-l'École (79270)
 Saint-Martin-de-Bernegoue (79273)
 Saint-Martin-de-Saint-Maixent (79276)
 Saint-Maxire (79281)
 Saint-Rémy (79293)
 Saint-Romans-des-Champs (79294)
 Saint-Romans-lès-Melle (79295)
 Saint-Symphorien (79298)
 Saint-Vincent-la-Châtre (79301)
 Saivres (79302)
 Salles (79303)
 Sansais (79304)
 Sauzé-Vaussais (79307)
 Sciecq (79308)
 Secondigné-sur-Belle (79310)
 Séligné (79312)
 Sepvret (79313)
 Soudan (79316)
 Souvigné (79319)
 Valdelaume (79140)
 Val-du-Mignon (79334)
 Vallans (79335)
 Vançais (79336)
 Le Vanneau-Irleau (79337)
 Vanzay (79338)
 Vernoux-sur-Boutonne (79343)
 Le Vert (79346)
 Villefollet (79348)
 Villemain (79349)
 Villiers-en-Bois (79350)
 Villiers-en-Plaine (79351)
 Villiers-sur-Chizé (79352)
 Vouillé (79355)

History

The arrondissement of Niort was created in 1800. At the January 2018 reorganisation of the arrondissements of Deux-Sèvres, it lost 21 communes to the arrondissement of Parthenay.

As a result of the reorganisation of the cantons of France which came into effect in 2015, the borders of the cantons are no longer related to the borders of the arrondissements. The cantons of the arrondissement of Niort were, as of January 2015:

 Beauvoir-sur-Niort
 Brioux-sur-Boutonne
 Celles-sur-Belle
 Champdeniers-Saint-Denis
 Chef-Boutonne
 Coulonges-sur-l'Autize
 Frontenay-Rohan-Rohan
 Lezay
 Mauzé-sur-le-Mignon
 Melle
 La Mothe-Saint-Héray
 Niort-Est
 Niort-Nord
 Niort-Ouest
 Prahecq
 Saint-Maixent-l'École-1
 Saint-Maixent-l'École-2
 Sauzé-Vaussais

References

Niort